Louis Tyler John (born 19 April 1994) is an English professional footballer who plays for Sutton United, as a central defender.

Career
Born in Croydon, John began his career with Crawley Town, moving on loan to Bognor Regis Town in September 2012. He next played for Sutton United, initially on loan before the transfer was made permanent. While with Sutton he spent loan spells at Lewes, Metropolitan Police, Hemel Hempstead Town, Hampton & Richmond Borough and Ebbsfleet United. In May 2018 it was announced that John would turn professional with Cambridge United for the 2018–19 season. In November 2019 he returned to Sutton United on a two-month loan deal, before the deal was made permanent in January 2020.

Career statistics

Honours

Club
Sutton United
 National League: 2020–21
EFL Trophy runner-up: 2021–22

References

1994 births
Living people
English footballers
Crawley Town F.C. players
Bognor Regis Town F.C. players
Sutton United F.C. players
Lewes F.C. players
Metropolitan Police F.C. players
Hemel Hempstead Town F.C. players
Hampton & Richmond Borough F.C. players
Ebbsfleet United F.C. players
Cambridge United F.C. players
English Football League players
Association football defenders
Isthmian League players
National League (English football) players